Cyber Weapon Z  is a manhua series adapted into a 3D-CG Chinese animation TV series in Hong Kong.

Background
In 1990 Andy Seto joined the Freeman publication label, where he took on drawing manhua and other comics.  In 1993 he started the 10 volume Cyber Weapon Z manhua series with writer Chris Lau in Hong Kong.  The story also ran as a 3D animation series in 1995.  Though much of the success did not begin until a French comic company, Tonkam, republished the comic in Europe where it became more popular.  Andy's style is heavily influenced by Yoshikazu Yasuhiko, who animated Venus Wars.

Story
For 1000 years, the men have understood the importance of the capacity and the economic stakes. Now, they live quietly thanks to an almost perfect social structure, and it is because of this way of life that physical faculties of the man do not evolve. They begin to deteriorate little by little. 
Park Iro and Anling are two newcomers with Southern Shaolin, one of the sections of martial arts of the most famous school of combat: the Monastery of Shaolin. The purpose of this school is to give rise to a new human race by developing to the maximum physical capacities of the students. As of the night of their arrival, an unknown force attacks the temple and awake Molitofu, a demon locked up 10 years before by the Luba general.

References

Hong Kong comics titles
Martial arts comics
Science fiction comics
1993 comics debuts
Computer-animated television series
Hong Kong animated television series